Hope on the Rocks is the sixteenth studio album by the American country music artist Toby Keith. It was released on October 30, 2012 by Show Dog-Universal Music. The first single released from the album was "I Like Girls That Drink Beer". The album's second single was the title track, "Hope on the Rocks". by October 2013, the album had sold 300,000 copies in the US.

Critical reception

Hope on the Rocks received mostly positive reviews from music critics. At Metacritic, which assigns an averaged score out of 100 to reviews from mainstream critics, the album received an average score of 71, based on five reviews. AllMusics Stephen Thomas Erlewine called the effort "a satisfying set of strong songs". Jewly Hight of American Songwriterwrote that "Beer and partying once again play starring roles on Hope On The Rocks", but that it "comes off as rather objectifying". Joseph Hudak of Country Weekly wrote that the album showed "maturity" over Keith's past works. Randy Lewis of the Los Angeles Times surmised that "Keith has clearly become a skilled listener, a vital trait for any songwriter — or bartender." Music Is My Oxygen Weeklys Rob Burkhardt found, "Taken together, Hope On the Rocks, while perhaps a tad predictable, still contains the basic building blocks that have helped Toby Keith achieve the success he has today: not just the celebration of booze, but the making of great music, as well." Roughstocks Matt Bjorke wrote that "Hope On The Rocks is a lean 10 track collection and for my money, it's a great mixture of classic Toby Keith sounds", which the album seems "never over-produced or feeling like a record that was made to just be a couple radio singles and filler." He called it a "cohesive album and ranks right up there with Toby's best". Taste of Countrys Billy Dukes criticized Hope on the Rocks as "a loud and sudsy collection of songs about beer, barrooms, heartbreak… and beer. Much like a Saturday night out at your favorite watering hole, it's rowdy and fun, but difficult to remember the next morning." Brian Mansfield of USA Today found that "Most of Keith's latest is a brawny drinker's paradise of horndogs, truckers and whiskey-running outlaws. But those shouldn't distract from its brooding country-pop, especially when Keith flaunts his inner Orbison on the title track".

Track listing

Personnel
Perry Coleman - background vocals
Chad Cromwell - drums
Eric Darken - percussion, tambourine
Scotty Emerick - gut string guitar
Kevin "Swine" Grantt - bass guitar
Kenny Greenberg - electric guitar
Aubrey Haynie - fiddle
Steve Hermann - trumpet
Jim Hoke - clarinet, dobro, harmonica, saxophone
Charlie Judge - accordion, Hammond B-3 organ, synthesizer
Toby Keith - lead vocals
Brent Mason - electric guitar
Rob McNelley - electric guitar
Steve Nathan - Hammond B-3 organ, piano, synthesizer
Russ Pahl - electric guitar, steel guitar, jews harp, lap steel guitar
Mica Roberts - background vocals
Ilya Toshinsky - acoustic guitar, resonator guitar, mandolin

Chart performance

Weekly charts

Year-end charts

References

2012 albums
Toby Keith albums
Show Dog-Universal Music albums
Albums produced by Toby Keith